Mandali Venkata Krishna Rao (August 4, 1926 – 2September ,7,1997),sknown a M.. V. Krishna Rao, was a politician and minister in Andhra Pradesh, India.

Brief life sketch
Mandali Venkata Krishna Rao, popularly known as Mandali, was born on 4 August 1926 ,in Pallevada village in Kaikaluru taluk of Krishna district, Andhra Pradesh, India. His Father,Venkatramaiah ,was a school teacher in Bhavadevarapalle ,in Divi taluk of Krishna district. Sri Mandali had his elementary education at Pallevada and Bhavadevarapalle, his high school education at Avanigadda ,and his collegiate education at Hindu College, Machiliatnam.

His political career started quite early in his life. During the Quit India Movement, he served as the president of the Avanigadda branch of the National Students Union. When the Congress Party was banned in the aftermath of the great movement, he organized the party effectively in rural areas as the Secretary of the Divi Taluk Congress Committee and participated in its underground activities. He was appointed organizing secretary of the District Students Congress in 1945. He represented the then Madras State at the Asian Students Conference held in Delhi in 1948. During 1948–52, he worked as the president of the district youth congress. He was the secretary of the Krishna District Congress Committee during 1953–56 and the Joint Secretary of the APCC during 1956–58. He also served as the convener for the constructive work committee and the Bhoodan Yagna Committee of the Pradesh Congress Committee. He was elected to the Lok Sabha from the Machilipatnam constituency in 1957 and served the Parliament during 1957–62. He was groomed in politics and into the Congress Party by his mentor, the late Sri Devabhaktuni Kotiswara Rao (Congress Kotiswara Rao) of Vemulapalli village.

He served as the vice-chairmen of the Zilla Parishad, Krishna between 1963 and 1969. In 1970, he was unanimously elected as the President, of Avanigadda Panchayat Samithi. He functioned as the General Secretary of the APCC between 1969 and 1972. In the General Elections of 1972, he was returned unopposed to the State Assembly for the Avanigadda constituency of Krishna district.

Sri P.V.Narasimha Rao inducted him into the State Cabinet in 1972 and was given charge of the Social Welfare and Fisheries portfolio till 1973 when the President's rule was imposed. He again joined Sri Vengal Rao's Cabinet as the Minister for Education and Cultural Affairs. He led the State delegation to the World Hindi Conference held at Nagpur in 1975 and went to Mauritius in 1976 to take part in the World Hindi Conference. He organized the first-ever World Telugu Conference in 1975 with the encouragement and support of the then Chief Minister, Sri Jalagam Vengal Rao and brought together all Telugus from all over the world.

After the 1977 Andhra Pradesh cyclone he was involved in voluntary organisations in the area to provide immediate relief.

The AP Voluntary Organizations and Social Workers Organizations, in recognition of his excellent service in the cyclone, presented him the Prabhakarji Memorial Award for the Best Social worker, 1978.

In 1982, he Joined Sri Kotla Vijaya Bhaskara Reddy's Cabinet as the Minister for Co-operation. In 1983, he visited Malaysia on the special invitation of Malaysia Andhra Sangham to participate in the Ugadi Celebrations and was awarded the title of "Telugu Data". In 1984, he visited the UK and the US and renewed his acquaintances with the Telugus there. He was honoured as the "Telugu Velugu" by the Madras Telugu Cultural Academy in 1985. He was again honoured as the "Suthradhari" at the third world conference in 1990 in Mauritius.

An individual noted for Gandhian Ideals, his concern for the poor, downtrodden and oppressed could be compared to a galaxy of patriots that thronged India. His love for the country was proverbial but his love for Divi Seema region could be called almost an obsession. He was indeed the "Diviseema Gandhi". The state lost a noble soul on 27 September 1997, and the nation a devoted worker with great concern for the poor and the downtrodden.

Mandali Venkata Krishna Rao Bridge
The Road Bridge between Puligadda-Penumudi over the Krishna River was named after him. It was opened to the public on 28 May 2006 by Chief Minister Y.S. Rajasekhara Reddy. It was constructed at a cost of Rs. 71 crores. Several agitations were launched in the past demanding the construction of the bridge.

The bridge will reduce the distances between the deltaic regions of the Krishna and Guntur districts. The distance between Avanigadda and Repalle would be reduced by 156 km, while the distance between Avanigadda and Tenali would come down by 114 km. Similarly, Narsapur of West Godavari and Repalli would come closer by 112 km and Machilipatnam and Repalli would be closer by 101 km.

Sri Mandali Venkata Krishna Rao Fisheries Polytechnic
The Fisheries Polytechnic was established in September 2007 under Sri Venkateswara Veterinary University at Bhavadevarapalli. The main objective of this college is to develop field-level technicians to support the aquaculture industry and technical support to the small and marginal farmers for sustainable aquaculture.

Mandali Venkata Krishna Rao International Telugu Centre
Potti Sreeramulu Telugu University is one of the few language-based Universities in the Country. It was founded with the objective of serving the cause of the Telugu people both within the country and abroad. The university through one of its wings "International Telugu Centre" has been serving Telugu people living outside Andhra Pradesh and in other countries in literary and cultural aspects. This centre was appropriately named after Mandali Venkata Krishna Rao who did exemplary services for the Telugu language and Culture in fact he was the person who established the International Telugu Institute in the year 1975 which was subsequently merged into Telugu University and has been functioning as one of its Centres.

Mandali Venkata Krishna Rao Cultural Award
Mandali Venkata Krishna Rao Cultural Award was instituted in 2007 and for the first time presented to Malaysian Telugu Association founder general secretary Madini Soma Naidu.

Family
He married Smt. Prabhavathi Devi. Mandali Buddha Prasad (Former Minister), Satyaprasad, Annapurna and Revathi are their four children. Dr P. Chandra Sekhar and Dr M. S. V. B. Koteswara Rao are their sons-in-law, and Vijayalakshmi and Vani sree are their daughters-in-law.

References

3
 Manava Manikyam(by Dr. Gandham Subba rao)
 Telugu jathi Sphurthipradhatha(by Buddiga Subbarayan,published by Potti Sreeramulu Telugu University)
 Man with Mission Mandali Venkata Krishna Rao(by Govindaraju Ramakrishna Rao,published by Potti Sreeramulu Telugu University)
 20th Century Luminaries, Potti Sreeramulu Telugu University, Hyderabad, 2005.

India MPs 1957–1962
1926 births
1997 deaths
Tamil Nadu ministers
Lok Sabha members from Andhra Pradesh
Andhra Pradesh district councillors
Indian National Congress politicians from Andhra Pradesh
People from Krishna district
Madras MLAs 1952–1957